The Weald School is a coeducational secondary school and sixth form. It caters for around 1,700 pupils in years 7 to 13, including over 300 in its sixth form. The school opened in 1956, and celebrated its 60th anniversary in the academic year 2016-17. In December 2008 Mr P May, headteacher since 1998, retired and Peter Woodman became the new Head having left RSA Academy Arrow Vale to take up the post. In December 2020 Peter Woodman retired, leaving Mrs Sarah Edwards (previously deputy Headteacher) as interim head teacher. Mrs Sarah Edwards was appointed headteacher in March 2021.

The school is located in the village of Billingshurst, West Sussex, England. Its grounds adjoin the main road through the village, and is shared with the local leisure facilities at Weald Recreation Centre. On 20 September 2008, the Weald Recreation Centre became the Billingshurst Leisure Centre. The Centre is run by D C Leisure on behalf of Horsham District Council.

The Weald admits students from a wide catchment area, reaching north to the Surrey/Sussex Border, south to Bury, west to Midhurst, and even into parts of Horsham.

Extracurricular activities

Radio Weald
Radio Weald is a Student Radio Station and has been running since 2001 and broadcasts over 87.7FM and across the school computer network once a year for a week at the end of the summer term. In July 2008 the station broadcast for the first time over the internet as well as on FM and in school. Since September 2007 there have also been regular Friday Lunchtime broadcasts played in the School Canteen. From September 2008 Radio Weald began sending out Friday Broadcasts over the internet through the Radio Weald website. Radio Weald now also has a forum for listeners and crew to have their say on the broadcasts and suggest ideas for upcoming shows. In the week commencing 13 July 2009, Radio Weald hosted their annual Week Broadcast, but with a difference. This time there was no broadcast over FM radio on 87.7FM like in previous years. Instead, it was heavily focused on the internet and in-school audience. The idea came from a visit by two students to the BBC, enjoying a whole day of media.

Weald TV
Weald TV is a student run television producer. They started producing content in September 2018 after the school received funding to buy a full green screen setup and outdoor filming setup. They meet on a Wednesday after school to plan and shoot videos for the school and local community. Weald TV is run by older students who train and teach the younger students as they progress through the schools leadership award system.

The Africa Project (Classrooms for Kenya)
Since a visit to Kenya by a number of staff and now ex-students in the summer of 2006 the school has had close links with a number of schools in Kenya. When the project started after this visit all of these schools had mud buildings which regularly got washed away and needed re-building. In the School's 50th Year (2006-7 Academic Year) the school decided to try and raise £50,000 to build new Brick Classrooms at these schools.  The Students rose to the challenge; in the summer of 2007 another set of staff and students went out to Kenya again to help build the new classrooms the school had paid for. Another trip was planned for the summer of 2008, but due to the political unrest in the country it was cancelled, and a teacher is going out instead to deliver a large amount of clothing, stationery and computer equipment to the rebuilt schools. After the failed trip of 2008 another big push is planned for the 2008-9 academic year. The plan is to raise another £30,000 to finish completely re-building Lumuli Primary School. This was and is in the worst state of all the schools the project has been working with and it is hoped that by the end of 2009 that it will be completely re-built to brick classrooms.

Notable alumni

Hinda Hicks, singer
Jon Edgar, sculptor (1979-1986)
Billy Twelvetrees, rugby union footballer
James Tilley, association footballer
Mike Coupe, British businessman and CEO of Sainsbury's

References

External links
 The Weald School website

Educational institutions established in 1956
Community schools in West Sussex
Secondary schools in West Sussex
1956 establishments in England